The Internationaux de Tennis de Toulouse is a professional tennis tournament played on clay courts. It is currently part of the Association of Tennis Professionals (ATP) Challenger Tour. It has been held in Toulouse, France since 2022.

Past finals

Singles

Doubles

References

ATP Challenger Tour
Clay court tennis tournaments
Tennis tournaments in France
Sport in Toulouse